Fatty Koo was an American R&B and hip-hop band from Columbus, Ohio that formed in 2005. The group's members were Eddie B, Gabrielle, Josh, Marya, Ron, and Valure. A television documentary on BET, Blowin Up: Fatty Koo, documented their career. Their debut single, "Bounce" was released in June 2005, and their debut album, House of Fatty Koo, was released on July 12, 2005, by Sony/Columbia Records. "Bounce" was selected as the anthem for TNT's NBA Playoffs in 2005. On May 26, 2005, Fatty Koo was awarded the key to the city of Columbus, the day officially being named "Fatty Koo Day".

Members 

 Kiana Allison (AKA Valure) - Singer/Songwriter
 Marya Barrios - Singer/Cellist/Songwriter
 Edward Brickerson (AKA Eddie B.) - Singer/Songwriter/Producer
 Ron Riley - Singer/Rapper/Songwriter/Producer
 Gabrielle Travis - Singer/Songwriter
 Joshua Welton - Singer/Saxophonist/ Songwriter

History 
The five original members from the musical collective Fatty Koo met in Columbus, Ohio. Eddie B, Gabrielle, Marya, Ron, and Valure had been active participants in the inner city's CAPACITY youth arts program and engaged in the CAPACITY-sponsored “Columbus Songwriters’ Summit for Oneness” in 2003. Through completion of the summit, each individual member was invited to record on the nonprofit John Lennon Educational Tour Bus that provided a state-of-the-art mobile recording studio. The original members recorded an eight-song demo, and recorded multiple videos, which were later watched by manager David Sonenberg. The members, who had mixed backgrounds and musical preferences, become a music group in the fall of 2003. Shortly after, Fatty Koo signed a record deal with SonyBMG.

In 2004 they began recording their debut album with songwriter/producer Toby Gad. In 2005, Fatty Koo began to audition for a new male vocalist to join the group. Miguel (singer) was initially considered, but he decided to pursue a solo career. Joshua Welton was later added to the group. Blowin Up: Fatty Koo aired on BET on April 21, 2005. The 13-episode reality TV show documented the group's career. Their debut album House of Fatty Koo was released on July 12, 2005.

Discography

Album

Single

References

External links 
 

Musical groups from Columbus, Ohio
American contemporary R&B musical groups
Midwest hip hop groups